Dick Beckner (November 24, 1927 – September 9, 1997) was an American gymnast. He competed in eight events at the 1956 Summer Olympics.

References

External links
 

1927 births
1997 deaths
American male artistic gymnasts
Olympic gymnasts of the United States
Gymnasts at the 1956 Summer Olympics
Gymnasts from Los Angeles
Pan American Games medalists in gymnastics
Pan American Games gold medalists for the United States
Gymnasts at the 1955 Pan American Games